José Daniel García Rodríguez (born January 27, 1986) is a former Mexican football defender. He last played for the  Atlante F.C. in the Primera División de México.

Club career
García debuted with Atlante on March 9, 2008, during a 3–2 loss to Cruz Azul. He won himself a spot in the first team, thanks to his great playing at Atlante's former filial team, Pegaso Real de Colima.

He began his career as a professional player Piedad 3rd division, played in Querétaro, Celaya 2nd Division, 2nd Division Palmero of Colima, the 1st A Colts Chetumal, Atlante UTN the 1st A. the 1st A Mérida

External links
 

1985 births
Living people
People from Sahuayo
Footballers from Michoacán
Mexican footballers
Association football defenders
Atlante F.C. footballers
C.F. Mérida footballers
Liga MX players
Mexican football managers